Russell Investments is an investment firm headquartered in Seattle, Washington.

Corporate overview
According to American Banker, Russell Investments has approximately $300 billion of assets under management, as of September 2019. The firm ranks as the third largest outsourced CIO (OCIO) provider globally. Additionally, the company has $2.6 trillion under advisement across 32 countries, making Russell Investments the world's fourth-largest adviser. The company has an investment outsourcing division to assist clients with investment and retirement portfolios, among other services. Clients have included AT&T, Boeing, and Union Pacific Railroad.

Russell Investments had approximately 1,350 employees, as of late 2019. The majority are based in Seattle, while others work at offices in London, New York City, Sydney, Tokyo, and Toronto, among other cities.

History
Founded by Frank Russell in 1936 in Tacoma, Washington, Russell Investments began as a stockbroker and consultant, and later created the Russell 2000 Index, one of the most followed stock market indices in the U.S. His grandson, George Russell, has been credited with expanding the company and pioneering the business of pension consulting when he secured J. C. Penney as the first pension client.

Northwestern Mutual acquired Russell Investments during 1998–1999 for $1.2 billion. The company's headquarters were relocated to Seattle in 2009.

In 2014, London Stock Exchange Group (LSEG) acquired the firm for $2.7 billion. Russell Investments had approximately $256 billion in assets under management at the time. LSEG separated the Russell Indexes from other Frank Russell group companies doing business as Russell Investments, such as asset management and consulting, opting to retain the former and sell the latter. LSEG announced the FTSE Russell brand in May 2015.

During 2015–2016, the company was valued at $1.15 billion and purchased by TA Associates, a Boston-based private equity firm, from LSEG. TA hired Goldman Sachs in 2019 to assess Russell Investments' possible sale.

Leadership
George Russell served as chairperson until 2002. Craig Ueland was promoted from chief operating officer to president in 2003. He succeeded Mike Phillips, who also served as chairperson, as chief executive officer (CEO) in 2004. Ueland was CEO until 2008, when Northwestern Mutual's John Schlifske was named president and CEO. Andrew S. Doman began serving as CEO starting in early 2009, and he was succeeded by Len Brennan in 2011. Michelle Seitz became the company's first female CEO, and seventh overall, in September 2017. Four months later, she became the chairperson as well.

See also
 List of asset management firms

References

London Stock Exchange Group
Investment management companies of the United States
Financial services companies established in 1936
Companies based in Seattle
1936 establishments in Washington (state)